South Park is an American animated television series.

South Park may also refer to:

South Park franchise
  South Park (film series), a film series originating with the television series:
 South Park: Bigger, Longer & Uncut, a 1999 full-length feature film
 South Park: Post Covid, a 2021 television film
 South Park: Post Covid: The Return of Covid, a sequel to the 2021 television film South Park: Post Covid
 South Park (franchise), a media franchise originating with the television series, including:
 South Park (video game), a 1998 first-person shooter game
 South Park: Chef's Luv Shack, a 1999 game-show style video game
 South Park: The Stick of Truth, a 2014 role-playing video game
 South Park: The Fractured but Whole, a 2017 sequel to the 2014 video game South Park: The Stick of Truth
 South Park Rally, a 2000 racing video game
 South Park (pinball), a 1999 pinball game

Places

Ireland
  South Park, an area in Galway

United Kingdom
 South Park, Fulham, city park in west London
 South Park, Ilford, area in East London
 South Park Primary School
 South Park, Oxford, a city park in Oxford
 Southpark Village, an estate in Glasgow

United States
 South Park Historic District (disambiguation)

California
 South Park, Los Angeles, a residential neighborhood in South Los Angeles, California
 South Park (Downtown Los Angeles), a residential and commercial neighborhood
 South Park, San Diego, one of the major historic Urban Communities of San Diego
 South Park, San Francisco, a neighborhood and a city park in San Francisco, California
 South Park, Santa Rosa, California, a neighborhood in Santa Rosa, California

Colorado
South Park, a historical name for Alamo Square Park, Colorado Springs
South Park (Saguache County, Colorado), a geologic flat near Mount Lion in the La Garita Mountains
South Park National Heritage Area
South Park (Park County, Colorado), a broad, flat valley surrounded by mountains
South Park City, alternate name of the town of Fairplay, Colorado in Park County
South Park City, a museum in Fairplay
South Park Railroad, the nickname name for the Denver, South Park and Pacific Railroad

Indiana
 South Park, Indiana

Kentucky
 South Park, Louisville, Kentucky

New York
 Cazenovia Park-South Park System, Buffalo, New York, listed on the NRHP in 1982

North Carolina
 SouthPark, Charlotte, North Carolina

Ohio
 South Park (RTA Rapid Transit station), Cleveland, Ohio
 South Park Historic District (Dayton, Ohio)
 South Park Site, a prehistoric site of the Whittlesey culture on the National Register of Historic Places

Oregon
 South Park Blocks, a city park in downtown Portland, Oregon

Pennsylvania
 South Park (PAT station), Bethel Park, Pennsylvania
 South Park (Pittsburgh)
 South Park Township, Allegheny County, Pennsylvania
South Park School District, Allegheny County, Pennsylvania

Texas
 South Park, Houston, Texas

Washington
 South Park, Seattle

West Virginia
 South Park, a neighborhood in Morgantown, West Virginia

Wyoming
 South Park, Wyoming

Other uses
 South Park F.C., a non-league football club in England
 South Park Bridge, a bridge in Seattle, Washington, United States
 South Park Hospital (nicknamed Sparky's), a fictional hospital used as the setting for the UK children's TV show Children's Ward
 South Park Settlement, a settlement house in San Francisco, California, United States

See also
 South Park Mall (disambiguation)